Darby's Harbour is a locality and former settlement located southwest of Swift Current in Paradise Sound, Placentia Bay, Newfoundland, Canada. It had a post office in 1940. The 1935 population was 21, but by 1990 it was uninhabited.

See also
List of communities in Newfoundland and Labrador

References 

Ghost towns in Newfoundland and Labrador